The 2008 NCAA Division I FBS football season was the highest level of college football competition in the United States organized by the National Collegiate Athletic Association (NCAA).

The regular season began on August 28, 2008 and ended on December 6, 2008. The postseason concluded on January 8, 2009 with the BCS National Championship Game in Miami Gardens, Florida, which featured the top two teams ranked by the Bowl Championship Series (BCS): the No. 2 Florida Gators and No. 1 Oklahoma Sooners. Florida defeated Oklahoma by a score of 24–14 to win their second BCS title in three years and third overall national championship in school history. The Utah Utes were selected national champions by Anderson & Hester after beating the Alabama Crimson Tide in the 2009 Sugar Bowl, finishing the season as the nation's only undefeated team.

Rule changes
The NCAA football rules committee made rule changes for 2008, including the following:
 Teams have 40 seconds from the time a ball is declared dead to snap the ball.  The 25 second play clock will still be used for administrative stoppages and penalties.
 The 15 second play clock after a TV timeout (adopted in the 2007 season) is repealed and returned to 25 seconds.
 Outside of the final two minutes of each half, if a runner goes out of bounds, the game clock restarts after the ball is spotted.
 The penalty for kicking the ball out of bounds on the kickoff is increased, placing the ball at the 40-yard line, similar to the NFL.
 Reinforcing that contact that leads with the crown of the helmet to another player (targeting) is a foul, penalized 15 yards.  
 All face-mask penalties result in a 15-yard penalty. Incidental contact with the face mask is no longer penalized.
 Sideline warnings are now penalized five yards for the first two occurrences, and 15 yards (unsportsmanlike conduct) for the third and subsequent violations.  Previously the officials gave teams two warnings before a five-yard penalty was called.
 All horse-collar tackles are now subject to a 15-yard penalty.
 If a coach challenges a play, and he wins the challenge, then he is given a second challenge to use later in the game, but each coach has a maximum of two challenges per game even if both are decided in his favor.

Conference and program changes
Western Kentucky upgraded from Division I FCS and played the 2008 season as a transitional Division I FBS member.

Regular season top 10 matchups
Rankings reflect the AP Poll. Rankings for Week 8 and beyond will list BCS Rankings first and AP Poll second. Teams that failed to be a top 10 team for one poll or the other will be noted.
Week 3
No. 1 USC defeated No. 5 Ohio State, 35–3 (Los Angeles Memorial Coliseum, Los Angeles, California)
Week 4
No. 6 LSU defeated No. 10 Auburn, 26–21 (Jordan-Hare Stadium, Auburn, Alabama)
Week 5
No. 8 Alabama defeated No. 3 Georgia, 41–30 (Sanford Stadium, Athens, Georgia)
Week 7
No. 5 Texas defeated No. 1 Oklahoma, 45–35 (Cotton Bowl, Dallas, Texas)
Week 9
No. 1/1 Texas defeated No. 6/7 Oklahoma State, 28–24 (Darrell K Royal–Texas Memorial Stadium, Austin, Texas)
No. 3/3 Penn State defeated No. 9/10 Ohio State, 13–6 (Ohio Stadium, Columbus, Ohio)
Week 10
No. 7/6 Texas Tech defeated No. 1/1 Texas, 39–33 (Jones AT&T Stadium, Lubbock, Texas)
No. 8/8 Florida defeated No. 6/5 Georgia, 49–10 (Jacksonville Municipal Stadium, Jacksonville, Florida)
Week 11
No. 2/2 Texas Tech defeated No. 9/8 Oklahoma State, 56–20 (Jones AT&T Stadium, Lubbock, Texas)
Week 13
No. 5/5 Oklahoma defeated No. 2/2 Texas Tech, 65–21 (Oklahoma Memorial Stadium, Norman, Oklahoma)
Week 15
No. 4/2 Florida defeated No. 1/1 Alabama, 31–20 (2008 SEC Championship Game, Georgia Dome, Atlanta, Georgia)

Most-watched regular season games

Conference standings

Conference champions

Conference championship games 
Rankings reflect the Week 14 AP Poll before the games were played.

Other conference champions 
Rankings are from the Week 15 AP Poll.

Bowl games 
Winners are listed in boldface.

Bowl Championship Series 

After the completion of the regular season and conference championship games, seven teams had secured BCS berths: ACC champion Virginia Tech, Big East champion Cincinnati, Big Ten champion Penn State, Big 12 champion Oklahoma, Pac-10 champion USC, SEC champion Florida, and Mountain West champion Utah, who qualified as the highest-ranked BCS non-AQ conference champion. With Oklahoma and Florida being selected to play in the championship, Texas and Alabama assumed their conference's berths in the Fiesta and Sugar Bowls, respectively. The remaining at-large berth was awarded to Ohio State, who were selected despite being ranked No. 10 by the BCS, behind No. 9 Boise State. No. 7 Texas Tech did not receive an at-large bid because the Big 12 had already been awarded the maximum of two BCS selections per conference.

Other bowl games

Bowl Challenge Cup standings 

* Does not meet minimum game requirement of three teams needed for a conference to be eligible.

Awards and honors

Heisman Trophy voting 
The Heisman Trophy is given to the year's most outstanding player.

 Winner: Sam Bradford, So., Oklahoma QB (1,726 pts)
 2. Colt McCoy, Jr., Texas QB (1,604 pts)
 3. Tim Tebow, Jr., Florida QB (1,575 pts)
 4. Graham Harrell Sr., Texas Tech QB (213 pts)
 5. Michael Crabtree, So., Texas Tech WR (116 pts)

Other major award winners 
Top Player

Coaching

Offense

Defense

Lineman

Special teams

Other

All-Americans

2008 Consensus All-America Team

Statistical leaders
Team scoring most points: Oklahoma, 716

Coaching changes

Pre-season

In-season

End of season

Final rankings 

* - The AFCA requires that their voters make the winner of the BCS Championship at the number one position in the final poll.
≠ - Kyle Whittingham, head coach of Utah, broke the AFCA requirement and voted his team number one on his ballot.

See also
 2008 Big 12 Conference South Division 3-way tie controversy

Notes

References